Dinuguan is a Filipino savory stew usually of pork offal (typically lungs, kidneys, intestines, ears, heart and snout) and/or meat simmered in a rich, spicy dark gravy of pig blood, garlic, chili (most often siling haba), and vinegar.

Etymology and names
The most popular term dinuguan and other regional naming variants come from their respective word for "blood" (e.g. "dugo" in Tagalog means "blood" hence  "dinuguan" as "to be stewed with blood"). Possible English translations include pork blood stew or blood pudding stew.

Dinuguan is also called sinugaok in Batangas, zinagan in Ibanag, twik in Itawis, tid-tad in Kapampangan, dinardaraan in Ilocano, dugo-dugo in Cebuano, rugodugo in Waray, sampayna or champayna in Northern Mindanao and tinumis in Bulacan and Nueva Ecija. A euphemism for this dish is "chocolate meat".

Dinuguan is also found in the Marianas Islands, believed to have been introduced to the islands by Filipino immigrants, where it is known locally as Fritada.

Description
This dish is rather similar to European-style blood sausage, or British and Irish black pudding in a saucy stew form. It is perhaps closer in appearance and preparation to the Polish soup Czernina or an even more ancient Spartan dish known as melas zomos (black soup) whose primary ingredients were pork, vinegar and blood.

Dinuguan can also be served without using any offal, using only choice cuts of pork. In Batangas, this version is known as sinungaok. It can also be made from beef and chicken meat, the latter being known as dinuguang manok ('chicken dinuguan'). Dinuguan is usually served with white rice or a Philippine rice cake called puto. The Northern Luzon versions of the dish, namely the Ilocano dinardaraan and the Ibanag zinagan are often drier with toppings of deep-fried pork intestine cracklings. The Itawes of Cagayan also have a pork-based version that has larger meat chunks and more fat, which they call twik.

The most important ingredient of the dinuguan recipe, pig's blood, is used in many other Asian cuisines either as coagulated blood acting as a meat extender or as a mixture for the broth itself. Pork dinuguan is the latter.

The dish is not consumed by religious groups that have dietary laws prohibiting the consumption of blood, most notably the indigenous Iglesia Ni Cristo, Jehovah's Witnesses, Seventh-day Adventists, and Filipino Jews.

Preparation

Serving suggestions

List of other regional variations
Other regional variants of dinuguan include:

 In Aklan, it is called dinuguan sa batwan, using the batwan fruit.
 In Bulacan, it is called serkele/sirkele, a specialty similar in ingredients to dinuguan but without pig's blood and using beef internal organs; soupy and on the sour side; other reports cow blood is used.
 In Marinduque, a local variant known as kari-kari is cooked with the same ingredients but is stewed until almost dry before the  pork blood is added.
 In Bicol, it is called tinutungang dinuguan, meaning, it contains coconut milk and chilies; it is called such because coconut milk is added, and charcoal embers are used to  cook the milk until curdling point at which it forms creamy reduction or latik.
 In Capiz, dinuguan na manok sa pinulipot nga abalong.
 In Cebu, dugo-dugo, which has itself many versions, with some adding cubes of solidified blood, just like in Pampanga's tid-tad, and other versions omitting the pork liver from the dish while the innards are chopped so finely down to the millimetre, so that the end result is a pork blood stew without the recognizable ingredients.
 In the Ilocos Region, in San Nicolas, it is a crispy dinuguan that uses bagnet slices.  While in Ilocos Norte, it is called mollo, a brownish and watery version of dinuguan.
 In Laguna, dinuguang kalabaw, dinuguan using the more flavorful "carabeef".
 In Leyte (Southern), it is mixed with banana blossoms and pig's blood.
 In Manila, dinuguan sa usbong ng sampalok, a Tagalog blood stew with young tamarind leaves.
 In Masbate, it is called sinanglay, where they add tanglad (lemongrass).
 In Northern Mindanao, it is called sampayna or champayna and also uses lemongrass.
 In Pampanga, dinuguang puti, synonym for tidtad babi which is not black or brown unlike the usual dinuguan because the blood is torn into pieces by hand after it curdles.
 In Pangasinan, it is called baguisen; it uses kamias as a souring agent; the offal is washed with detergent then boiled in guava leaves to get rid of the smell; in Barangay Inirangan, Bayambang, they include upo slices in their baguisen.
 In Quezon Province, it is called pirihil, a dinuguan of chicken gizzard, heart and liver.
 In Visayas, called paklay, a Visayan blood stew of blood and intestine of goat, but a little bit drier.
 In Zamboanga/Basilan or Cavite (Chavacano), "Chavacano-style dinuguan", which uses tuba (sugar cane) vinegar and contains crushed oregano leaves.

See also

 Beutelwurst
 Black soup
 Blood as food
 Blood soup
 List of stews
 Saksang
 Sarapatel
 Svartsoppa

References

Blood dishes
Philippine stews
Pork dishes
Guamanian cuisine